Güçüş   is a village in Erdemli district of Mersin Province, Turkey. At  it is  situated in the forests of Toros Mountains to the east of Alata creek canyon. The population of Çiriş was 252   as of 2012. The village is a Turkmen village. It was named after the phrase Güç iş meaning "Hard work", referring to the hardships encountered during the foundation of the village. The main economic activity of the village is farming. Tomato and cucumber are among the more important crops of the village. Olive production is on the rise.

References

Villages in Erdemli District